Shahrabad (also Romanized as Shahrābād; also known as Shahrwa) is a village in Shahrabad Rural District of the Central District of Firuzkuh County, Tehran province, Iran. At the 2006 National Census, its population was 488 in 152 households. The following census in 2011 counted 588 people in 198 households. The latest census in 2016 showed a population of 822 people in 266 households; it was the largest village in its rural district.

References 

Firuzkuh County

Populated places in Tehran Province

Populated places in Firuzkuh County